Caylee is a given name.  Notable people with the name include:
Caylee Anthony (2005–2008), American two-year old murder victim
Caylee Cowan, actress in the 2019 American film Sunrise in Heaven
Caylee Hammack (born 1994), American country music singer and songwriter
Caylee Turner, ring name of Christina Crawford (born 1988), American professional wrestler
Caylee Watson (born 1994), United States Virgin Islands swimmer

See also

Carlee
 Cayley (surname)
 Kaylee, given name
 Kayleigh (disambiguation), includes list of people with surname Kayleigh
 Kayla (name), similar female given name with different etymologies

Feminine given names